Prioneris thestylis, the spotted sawtooth, is a small butterfly of the family Pieridae, that is, the yellows and whites, which is found in India and Southeast Asia.

References

External links

Prioneris
Butterflies of Asia
Butterflies of Indochina
Taxa named by Henry Doubleday
Butterflies described in 1842